Infinity Ward, Inc. is an American video game developer. They developed the video game Call of Duty, along with seven other installments in the Call of Duty series. Vince Zampella, Grant Collier, and Jason West established Infinity Ward in 2002 after working at 2015, Inc. previously. All of the 22 original team members of Infinity Ward came from the team that had worked on Medal of Honor: Allied Assault while at 2015, Inc. Activision helped fund Infinity Ward in its early days, buying up 30 percent of the company. The studio's first game, World War II shooter Call of Duty, was released on the PC in 2003. The day after the game was released, Activision bought the rest of Infinity Ward, signing employees to long-term contracts. Infinity Ward went on to make Call of Duty 2, Call of Duty 4: Modern Warfare, Call of Duty: Modern Warfare 2, Call of Duty: Modern Warfare 3, Call of Duty: Ghosts, Call of Duty: Infinite Warfare, the Modern Warfare reboot, and its sequel.

Co-founder Collier left the company in early 2009 to join parent company Activision. In 2010, West and Zampella were fired by Activision for "breaches of contract and insubordination", they soon founded a game studio called Respawn Entertainment. On May 3, 2014, Neversoft was merged into Infinity Ward.

History
Infinity Ward was founded as an Activision division by Grant Collier, Jason West, and Vince Zampella in 2002. The studio was formed by several members of 2015 Games, LLC., the studio that developed the successful Medal of Honor: Allied Assault for Electronic Arts (EA) in 2002. Dissatisfied with the current contract they had under EA, Collier, West, and Zampella engaged with Activision to help establish Infinity Ward, which became one of the primary studios within Activision for the competing Call of Duty series. Initially, Activision provided Infinity Ward  for 30% stake in the company to start development on the first game Call of Duty, acquiring full ownership after the title was successfully launched in 2003. During this period, the studio was about 25 employees including many who followed Collier, West, and Zampella from 2015. Activision allowed Infinity Ward a great deal of freedom in how it developed its titles.

Shortly after this release, Microsoft contacted Activision to seek a Call of Duty title as a launch title for the upcoming Xbox 360 console. Infinity Ward agreed to prepare Call of Duty 2 for release in the last quarter of 2005. Collier said the request would help them lose the stigma of being only a personal computer developer, and so to make sure the console version was on parity, they tripled their staff to about 75 employees. Much of the focus of Infinity Ward's development was improving its game engine to include realistic special effects, such as smoke grenades to hinder sight, or bullets piercing through weak materials. Call of Duty 2 was a major success, having an 85% attach rate to new Xbox 360 console sales, and selling 1.4 million units its first year. At this point, Activision brought in Treyarch, one of their internal studios, to help develop additional Call of Duty games, with Infinity Ward spending the time and effort to improve the game's engine for one game, and Treyarch using the updated engine to create a new title. Treyarch released the next sequel Call of Duty 3 while Infinity Ward itself developed Call of Duty 4: Modern Warfare, which instead of taking place during World War II, was set in a contemporary period with a fictional conflict between superpowers. At the time of Modern Warfares release, Infinity Ward had more than 100 employees.

2010 employee firings and departures
Following the critical and financially successful release of Call of Duty 4: Modern Warfare in 2007, Jason West (president, co-CCO, and CTO) and Vince Zampella (CEO) began contract negotiations with Activision. They promised to deliver Call of Duty: Modern Warfare 2 in 2009, but in exchange asked for extremely large bonuses and creative control of the Call of Duty series. Activision agreed, but added a clause to the contract that should they be fired, the rights to Call of Duty would fall back to Activision.

Following the execution of the contract in 2008, Activision began seeking ways to find reason to fire West and Zampella to trigger the new clause. This in turn led to West and Zampella look to means to make Infinity Ward a studio outside of Activision's control. Events came to a head in February 2010 when Activision hired a lawfirm to investigate Infinity Ward. On March 1, 2010, West and Zampella were released by Activision for "insubordination", forfeiting the bonuses they had negotiated. The pair went on to form Respawn Entertainment in April 2010 as an independent studio, through working closely with EA on a yet-announced project. Several dozen of Infinity Ward's employees resigned in the following months, many taking up positions at Respawn.

West and Zampella had been replaced on an interim basis by Activision CTO Steve Pearce and head of production Steve Ackrich. By November 2010, Activision had installed new management at Infinity Ward, and Vivendi chairman and CEO Jean-Bernard Lévy stated that Infinity Ward "got over" their problems and are fully reconstructed and that Activision is very happy with the result. The executive went on to say that there will be three studios working on the Call of Duty franchise including the newly formed studio Sledgehammer Games.

Several lawsuits followed in the wake of West and Zampella's departure. Activision countersued the pair in April 2010, calling their actions to fire them justified and asserting the two were "self-serving schemers". Activision amended its suit in December 2010 to include EA as a defendant, stating that their competitor had worked with West and Zampella to "destabilize, disrupt and ... destroy Infinity Ward", and sought  in damages.

2012 departure of Robert Bowling

On March 27, 2012, Robert Bowling issued the following statement on his Twitter account: "Today, I resign from my position as Creative Strategist of Call of Duty, as a lead of Infinity Ward, and as an employee of Activision". In response to this, Activision issued the following statement, "We sincerely thank Robert for his many years of service. He's been a trusted and valued member of the Infinity Ward team. We wish him all the best on his decision to pursue future opportunities". Bowling allegedly left because he was unhappy with the slow evolution of the game, as he responded with "Too much 'pew pew' not enough new new" to a question on the subject.

Signs of disagreement between Bowling and Infinity Ward arose in a live interview with Machinima when he stated the following: "I feel like we are in a fucking era where everyone is so focused on subscriber numbers and all that stuff that we need to get back to what I feel like we did so much better in the old days of just plain good will, like stuff like the LAN patch, yeah it is lower priority but let's get it out the fucking door. Let's just do it." This could be a contributing factor to his resignation. Another factor could have been from the amount of harsh criticism Bowling received on Twitter from the fans and players.

Neversoft merger and further expansion
In May 2014, Neversoft was merged with Infinity Ward to form a single 'super-studio' after both collaborated on the development of Call of Duty: Ghosts. Neversoft studio head Joel Jewett and studio director Scott Pease retired shortly after the completion of the merger.

Infinity Ward presently operates in four locations – California, Texas, Poland, and Mexico. The studio in Krakow, Poland opened in December 2017. The studio serves as a research and development center, and is headed by principal rendering engineer Michal Drobot. The Poland studio assisted in rebuilding the IW engine for the 2019 reboot of Modern Warfare and Call of Duty: Warzone. In October 2021, Infinity Ward opened a new studio in Austin, Texas.

Reception

Infinity Ward's first title, Call of Duty, won 90 Game of the Year awards and 50 Editor's Choice Awards. It also continues to be among the highest-rated games, according to GameRankings. Call of Duty 4: Modern Warfare  enjoyed massive commercial and critical success, selling over 13 million copies from its release in November 2007 through May 2009.

In 2010, Infinity Ward was ranked third by Develop 100 only running up to developer Nintendo and Bungie for the top 100 developers based on the sales of their games in the UK.

Infinity Ward's sequel to Call of Duty 4: Modern Warfare, Call of Duty: Modern Warfare 2, earned over $550 million in sales in its first five days on the market, with $310 million of those sales made in the first 24 hours after the game's release.

The sequel to Modern Warfare 2, Call of Duty: Modern Warfare 3, sold 6.5 million copies in the US and UK alone and grossed $400 million within 24 hours of going on sale.

Game engines

Infinity Ward used an enhanced version of the id Tech 3 engine from Quake III Arena for the first Call of Duty in 2003. For Call of Duty 2, Infinity Ward heavily modified the engine, featuring more powerful visuals and DirectX 9 support, and was known internally as the "IW" game engine. The version that was used for Call of Duty 2 was designated as IW 2.0. Call of Duty 4: Modern Warfare runs on a highly upgraded version of the engine from Call of Duty 2 dubbed "IW 3.0", with features that include true world-dynamic lighting, HDR lighting effects, dynamic shadows and depth of field. The Call of Duty: Black Ops sub-series and the James Bond video game Quantum of Solace were developed by Treyarch using modified versions of Infinity Ward's engine.

Call of Duty: Modern Warfare 2, uses an upgraded engine dubbed "IW 4.0", which is a generation more advanced than the engine used in Call of Duty 4: Modern Warfare. Call of Duty: Modern Warfare 3 uses IW 5.0 (MW3 Engine), an improved version of the IW 4.0 engine. Improvements on the engine allow better streaming technology which allows larger regions for the game while running at a minimum of 60 frames per second, improvements to the audio of the engine have also been made.

Call of Duty: Ghosts features an upgraded next-generation version of the IW 5.0 seen in Call of Duty: Modern Warfare 3. IW 6.0 is compatible with next-gen systems such as Xbox One and PlayStation 4 so polygon counts, texture detail and overall graphical fidelity has been increased. IW 6.0 is also compatible with Microsoft Windows, Wii U, PS3 and Xbox 360. The IW 6.0 engine features technology from Pixar, SubD, which increases the level of detail of models as one gets closer to them. Mark Rubin has said about the HDR lighting "We used to paint it in and cover up the cracks, but now it's all real-time". Ghosts uses Iris Adjust tech which allows the player to experience from a person's point of view how their eyes would react to changes in lighting conditions realistically. Other features include new animation systems, fluid dynamics, interactive smoke, displacement mapping and dynamic multiplayer maps. Call of Duty: Infinite Warfare'''s IW 7.0 features weightlessness system, game physics improvement, improved AI and improved non-player characters behaviors.

Modern Warfare (2019 reboot) and Call of Duty: Warzone uses a heavily rebuilt IW engine for the series, allowing for the use of more detailed environments, advanced photogrammetry and rendering, better volumetric lighting, and the use of ray tracing. The new engine had been in development five years prior to the release of the game, and was a collaborative effort between the main Infinity Ward studio in California and the new studio in Poland.Call of Duty: Modern Warfare II is developed on a highly upgraded version of the engine first used in 2019's Modern Warfare''. The engine is co-developed by Infinity Ward, Treyarch, and Sledgehammer Games, and will be used in future installments of the series in a unified effort to ensure that every studio is working with the same tools.

Games

References

External links
 

2002 establishments in California
Activision
American companies established in 2002
Companies based in Los Angeles
Video game companies established in 2002
Former Vivendi subsidiaries
Video game companies based in California
Video game development companies
2003 mergers and acquisitions